Sclater may refer to:

Arthur Sclater (1859 – 16 June 1882), Irish-born English cricketer
Edith Sclater (1856–1927), Dame Commander of the Order of the British Empire
Philip Lutley Sclater (1829–1913), English lawyer and zoologist 
William Lutley Sclater (1863–1944),  the son of P.L. Sclater, British zoologist and museum director
Arthur Sclater (Royal Marines officer) (1909–2002), British Royal Marines officer